Philips Head, or Phillips Head, is a local service district and designated place in the Canadian province of Newfoundland and Labrador. It is in the north-central portion of the island of Newfoundland. It is in the Bay of Exploits, west of Lewisporte and north of Botwood.

History 
The post office was established on February 3, 1958. The first postmistress was Doris Jessie March. Located within the community are the remains of an old World War II gun battery and shelter, sans artillery, as well as an old watch tower and fuel tank.

The artillery station constructed at Phillip's Head was elaborate in scope. It boasted a three-storey lookout tower and a 700-foot underground passage that connected 11 rooms filled with ammunition, secret documents and supplies. The entire station was surrounded by barbed wire fencing and fitted with drain pipes intended to flood the facility in the event of enemy invasion. Booby traps were also set up along the underground passage and two hidden escape hatches were installed.

Geography 
Phillips Head is in Newfoundland within Subdivision E of Division No. 8.

Demographics 

Government 
Phillips Head is a local service district (LSD) that is governed by a committee responsible for the provision of certain services to the community. The chair of the LSD committee is Reg Stride.

See also 
List of communities in Newfoundland and Labrador
List of designated places in Newfoundland and Labrador
List of local service districts in Newfoundland and Labrador

References 

Populated coastal places in Canada
Designated places in Newfoundland and Labrador
Local service districts in Newfoundland and Labrador